Dimaku Fidelis Tochukwu (born 22 April 1989, in Lagos) is a Nigerian footballer who plays as a defender for Hapoel Acre F.C.

Club career
Fidelis played in the Ironi Nir Ramat HaSharon of the second division in Israel; after playing for the youth team of Beitar Jerusalem. He spent 2 successful years before signing for Hapoel Acre F.C. in the Israel Premier League.

On August 21, 2011 it was reported in Israeli media that Fidelis was moving to Serbian champions Partizan Belgrade, but the president of Hapoel Acre dismissed the reports, refusing to sell the player.

International career
He played 3 games for the dream team of Nigeria in the 2011 CAF U-23 Championship unfortunately they did not qualify for the Olympics.

References

External links
 
 

1989 births
Living people
Nigerian footballers
Nigerian expatriate footballers
Beitar Jerusalem F.C. players
Hapoel Nir Ramat HaSharon F.C. players
Hapoel Acre F.C. players
Liga Leumit players
Israeli Premier League players
Association football defenders